Kenyon may refer to:

Names
 Kenyon (given name)
 Kenyon (surname)

Places
 Kenyon, Cheshire, United Kingdom, a village
 Kenyon, Minnesota, United States, a city
 Kenyon, Rhode Island, United States, a village
 Kenyon, former name of Pineridge, California, United States
 Kenyon Peaks, Antarctica
 Mount Kenyon, Antarctica

Other uses
 Kenyon Medal, awarded in recognition of work in the field of classical studies and archaeology
 Baron Kenyon, a title in the Peerage of Great Britain
 Kenyon & Kenyon, American law firm specializing in intellectual property
 Kenyon College, Gambier, Ohio
 Kenyon Bridge, a historic covered bridge in Cornish, New Hampshire
 the title character of Daisy Kenyon, 1947 film starring Joan Crawford and Henry Fonda

See also
 The Kenyon Review, American literary journal
 Kinyon (disambiguation)
 Kenyan